King Su of Chu (died 370 BC) was from 380 to 370 BC the king of the state of Chu during the Warring States period of ancient China. He was born Xiong Zang and King Su was his posthumous title.

King Su succeeded his father King Dao of Chu, who died in 381 BC. King Su died in 370 BC after 11 years of reign. Since he had no sons, his younger brother Xiong Liangfu ascended the throne and is known as King Xuan of Chu.

Upon his accession to Chu's throne, he executed more than seventy families who participated in the murder of Wu Qi and the insulting of King Dao of Chu's corpse. However, he also abolished Wu Qi's reformed policies.

During his rule, King Su fought with two of the three Jins; Han and Wei. In 375 BCE, Han exterminated the state of Zheng which was in alliance with Chu for centuries.

References

Monarchs of Chu (state)
Chinese kings
4th-century BC Chinese monarchs
370 BC deaths
Year of birth unknown